Marimari River is tributary of the Abacaxis River in Amazonas state in north-western Brazil. It merges into the Abacaxis River shortly before the latter merges into the Paraná Urariá.

See also
List of rivers of Amazonas

References
Brazilian Ministry of Transport

Rivers of Amazonas (Brazilian state)